The 2018 United States Senate election in Michigan took place on November 6, 2018, in order to elect the Class 1 U.S. Senator from the State of Michigan, concurrently with a gubernatorial election, as well as other elections to the U.S. House of Representatives.

Incumbent Democratic U.S. Senator Debbie Stabenow won reelection to a fourth term.  On August 7, 2018, John James won the Republican nomination, defeating businessman Sandy Pensler. On May 5, 2018, Marcia Squier received the endorsement and nomination of the Green Party of Michigan at the state convention in Flint.

Stabenow was re-elected by a 6.5% margin and a difference of 275,660 votes, making this the second-closest U.S. Senate election in Michigan since Stabenow was first elected in 2000.

Democratic primary

Candidates

Nominee
 Debbie Stabenow, incumbent U.S. Senator

Declined
 Mike Duggan, Mayor of Detroit

Withdrew
 Craig Allen Smith

Endorsements

Results

Republican primary

Candidates

Nominee
 John James, businessman and Iraq veteran

Defeated in primary
 Sandy Pensler, Former Wayne County Commissioner, businessman and candidate for MI-08 in 1992  
 Failed to qualify

 Bob Carr, historic preservationist, businessman and nominee for MI-01 in 1996

Declined
 John Engler, former governor
 Ted Nugent, musician and political activist (endorsed James)
 Robert Ritchie, better known as musician Kid Rock (endorsed James)
 Bill Schuette, Michigan Attorney General, former U.S. Representative and nominee for U.S. Senate in 1990 (ran for Governor)
 Fred Upton, U.S. Representative

Withdrew
 Lena Epstein, businesswoman (running for MI-11)
 Robert P. Young Jr., former Chief Justice of the Michigan Supreme Court (endorsed John James)

Endorsements

Debates
A debate was held between John James and Sandy Pensler on July 6 and televised by WKAR-TV. It was the only televised debate scheduled between the two candidates.

Polling

Results

Green Party Convention
The Green Party of Michigan picked their candidates at a state convention on May 5, 2018.

Declared

 Marcia Squier, Green nominee for MI-14 in 2016

Withdrew

 Anita Belle, activist

General election

Debates
Complete video of debate, October 14, 2018

Fundraising

Predictions

Endorsements

Polling 

with Sandy Pensler

with generic Democrat and Republican

with Robert Ritchie (a.k.a. Kid Rock)

Results
Although Stabenow ended up winning the election by 6.5 percent, the margin was smaller than expected, considering the polling and past results of Senate elections in Michigan.  Part of the relative closeness of the race has been attributed to the Stabenow campaign having run no negative ads against James during the election. Although James won most of Michigan's smaller counties, Stabenow won large margins in urban areas and modest margins in suburban areas. Stabenow trounced James in Wayne County, home of Detroit, and also performed well in Detroit's suburbs. She also easily won in Washtenaw County, home of Ann Arbor and Ingham County, home of Lansing. Kent County, home of Grand Rapids, also narrowly flipped to Stabenow, making this the first Senate election of her career in which she carried the county, and also the only county to flip her direction in 2018, and only the second time (after Carl Levin in 2008) a Democrat had carried the county since Donald Riegle in 1982. In addition to Stabenow's win, Democrats won the previously Republican-held offices of Governor, Secretary of State, and Attorney General, ensuring that as of January 1, 2019, all elected statewide officials would be Democrats. James once again ran unsuccessfully for the other Senate seat in 2020, as he was defeated by incumbent Gary Peters. James would later be elected as a Representative in Michigan's 10th congressional district in 2022.

Notes

Partisan clients

References

External links
Candidates at Vote Smart
Candidates at Ballotpedia
Campaign finance at FEC
Campaign finance at OpenSecrets

Official campaign websites
John James (R) for Senate
Debbie Stabenow (D) for Senate 
Marcia Squier (G) for Senate

2018
Michigan
United States Senate